Anna-Lena Grönefeld and Meghann Shaughnessy were the defending champions, but none competed this year.

Lindsay Davenport and Corina Morariu won the title by defeating Natalie Grandin and Trudi Musgrave 6–3, 6–4 in the final.

Seeds
The top three seeds received a bye into the second round.

Draw

Draw

References
 Main and Qualifying Rounds

Wismilak International
Commonwealth Bank Tennis Classic
Sport in Bali